The voiceless linguolabial fricative is a type of consonantal sound used in some spoken languages.

Features 

Features:

Occurrence

References

Linguolabial consonants
Pulmonic consonants
Voiceless oral consonants